A quoin is a device used to lock printing type in a chase in letterpress printing.  Quoins are pairs of wedges, facing opposite directions.  A wrench or quoin key forces them together.

References 

Letterpress printing
Relief printing